Apechthis is a genus of insects belonging to the family Ichneumonidae.

The genus was first described by Förster in 1869.

The genus has almost cosmopolitan distribution.

Species:
 Apechthis rufata (Gmelin, 1790)

References

Pimplinae
Ichneumonidae genera